Jennifer Dulos ( Farber; born September 27, 1968) is an American woman who went missing on May 24, 2019. Authorities suspect that she was killed in a violent attack at her home in New Canaan, Connecticut. Her ex-husband, Fotis Dulos, and his girlfriend, Michelle Troconis, were arrested on charges of tampering with evidence and hindering prosecution in connection with Jennifer's disappearance. Later, the two  along with Fotis' attorney Kent Mawhinney  faced additional charges related to Jennifer's murder. Fotis died by suicide in January 2020. Legal proceedings against Troconis and Mawhinney were ongoing as of June 2022.

Jennifer and Fotis were in the midst of both a contentious divorce and child-custody proceedings. Police suspect that Fotis had been lying in wait for Jennifer and attacked her when she arrived at her home, after dropping her children off at school. Police allege that he and Troconis drove to Hartford to dispose of garbage bags containing items with Jennifer's blood on them on the night that Jennifer disappeared. Police further allege that Mawhinney conspired with Fotis and Troconis. If convicted, they will spend life behind bars.

Background 

Jennifer Farber Dulos (born September 27, 1968) was born in New York City to Gloria Ortenberg and Hilliard Farber, a banker and philanthropist respectively. She has an older sister, Melissa Irene Farber. Jennifer's maternal aunt and uncle, Elizabeth Claiborne and Arthur Ortenberg, founded the fashion company Liz Claiborne Inc. Jennifer graduated from Brown University in 1990, and later earned a master's degree in writing from New York University Tisch School of the Arts. A stay-at-home mother, Jennifer made her living as a writer for Patch.com, and also ran her own blog.

Fotis Dulos (August 6, 1967  January 30, 2020) was born in Turkey and grew up in Athens, Greece, moving to the U.S. in 1986. He graduated from Brown University in 1989, and later earned an MBA in finance from Columbia Business School. Fotis married Hilary Vanessa Aldama, also a Brown graduate, in Athens in June 2000. The marriage lasted four years, and they were divorced on July 12, 2004. That year Dulos founded Fore Group Inc., a real estate development company specializing in luxury homes based in Connecticut.

Dulos started emailing Farber, whom he'd also met at Brown, whilst still with his first wife. They married in Manhattan just over a month after Dulos' divorce, on August 28, 2004, and subsequently moved to Farmington, Connecticut. They had five children together, including two sets of twins, all named after Greek Orthodox saints  three sons: Petros, Theodore, and Constantine; and two daughters: Christiane and Cleopatra Noelle.

In a blog post on March 12, 2012, Jennifer alluded to trouble in her marriage: "I wish I were a strong person and that confrontation did not both scare and appall me." After the gradual breakdown of the marriage, in which Jennifer claimed Fotis was living an increasingly independent life, she filed for divorce on June 20, 2017, at Superior Court in Stamford. In the same month she started renting a house in New Canaan, about seventy miles southwest of Farmington, and moved there with her five children.

In her divorce documents, Jennifer wrote: "I know that filing for divorce, and filing this motion will enrage him. I know he will retaliate by trying to harm me in some way." She also stated she believed he was having an affair with his colleague, Michelle Troconis, a native of Venezuela. Jennifer also alleged that Fotis had threatened to kidnap their children if she did not agree to his terms in the divorce settlement, and that he had bought a gun that year; Fotis denied making threats and claimed he bought the gun legally for home security. Both parents filed numerous motions claiming that the other was disparaging them.

Despite Jennifer's requesting an emergency order of custody, the couple were given temporary joint custody of their children until the end of the divorce proceedings. When Jennifer again requested an emergency order of custody in early 2018, the judge found that Fotis had broken numerous court orders. In March 2018 Jennifer was awarded sole physical custody of the children, while both parents were to share joint legal custody. Fotis was granted supervised visitation and monitored phone calls.

In February 2018, after Jennifer's father's death, Gloria Farber, Jennifer's mother, sued Fotis for unpaid loans. She claimed he owed them $1.7 million loaned to him by his father-in-law Hilliard Farber.

Disappearance 

Jennifer was last seen at around 8:00 am on May 24, 2019, when she dropped her children off at New Canaan Country School, and then at 8:05 am on a neighbor's security camera returning home. The same day, she missed two doctors' appointments that she had scheduled for 11:00 am and 1:00 pm in New York City. Later that evening, at around 7:00 pm, two of her friends, including her nanny Lauren Almeida, reported her missing after they failed to get in contact with her. Family and friends of Jennifer stated that it would be out of character for her to leave home on her own without telling anyone.

Almeida, who had arrived at the house at 11:30 am that day, later told detectives she was surprised to see Jennifer's Range Rover in the garage because she had planned to take it to her doctors' appointments instead of her Chevrolet Suburban, which was missing. When detectives searched the house, they found blood spatter on the floor, door and a wall in the garage, as well as on the exterior of the Range Rover. Blood was also found in the kitchen. DNA tests revealed most of the blood to be Jennifer's, apart from blood on the kitchen faucet, a mixture belonging to both her and her husband, Fotis. Police also found other evidence of Jennifer being the victim of a serious assault.

Jennifer's Chevrolet Suburban had been captured on the neighbor's security camera leaving her home at around 10:25 am that morning. Fotis was believed to be the one driving the victim's vehicle, carrying the body of Jennifer and other items associated with the probable cleanup. That same evening, at around 7:30 pm, Fotis and Troconis were captured on video dumping garbage bags in thirty bins in Hartford. The trash bags were found to contain various pieces of bloodied clothing, as well as bloodstained cleaning items. The blood was determined to be that of Jennifer. Fotis' DNA was found on the inside of a glove in one of the trash bags, and on one of the trash bags. The Suburban was later found at the side of a road near Waveny Park in New Canaan, just over three miles away from her home.

At the time Jennifer went missing, she and her husband were estranged and still engaged in a tumultuous divorce. They were also involved in the ongoing contentious child-custody proceedings.

Police searched numerous properties in and around Farmington, in Fairfield County, and near Fotis' home without success. Investigators believe he arrived by bike to Jennifer's home due to tire marks found and other evidence. Fotis is believed to have been lying in wait for his estranged wife to return home, and killed her in the garage when she returned from dropping their kids at school. Helicopters were used to look for signs of Jennifer, as well as canine units and divers. There has been no activity on her credit cards and no calls made from her cell phone as of May 24.

On January 19, 2021, the Connecticut State Police visited property on Mountain Spring Road in Farmington, which was once owned by Fotis' real estate company, to follow up on "old leads". Several authorities could be seen behind the property digging up the yard. Police also brought in Bob Perry, a nationally renowned expert at finding unmarked gravesites, though he would not say what, if anything, had been discovered. The next day, police returned to the Mountain Spring Road property with an excavator and a septic tank. Police briefly spoke with the media but said they did not have any updates.

Initial arrests 

On June 1, 2019, Fotis and Troconis were arrested at a hotel in Avon, Connecticut, and charged with tampering with evidence and hindering prosecution. Not enough evidence existed at that time to warrant any more serious charges. The Dulos' five children, then aged between 8 and 13, moved to New York City to live with Jennifer's mother, to whom a judge granted temporary custody.

Fotis hired attorney Norm Pattis to represent him. In an interview, prior to being hired by Fotis, Pattis had appeared convinced that Jennifer was dead. Fotis and Troconis both pleaded not guilty to the charges. They were again arrested for tampering with evidence, and again pleaded not guilty, in September 2019. Fotis appeared in court on October 4 to seek a dismissal of the charges against him. The judge said he would review arguments by the defense and prosecution.

In late October, it was reported Troconis, along with her 10-year-old daughter, had moved out of Fotis' $5 million home in Farmington.

2020 arrests 

On January 7, 2020, Fotis was arrested at his home by the Connecticut State Police and charged with capital murder, murder, and kidnapping in relation to Jennifer's disappearance. Troconis was also arrested and charged with conspiracy to commit murder. Fotis' friend and former attorney, Kent Douglas Mawhinney (often misreported as Mahwinney), was also detained on January 7 and charged with conspiracy to commit murder. Despite these arrests, Jennifer's body is yet to be found.

Mawhinney became estranged from his wife after being accused of spousal rape. His wife went to South Windsor police and told authorities that she feared Fotis and Mawhinney were working together to kill her. After Jennifer disappeared, a shallow grave was discovered at a secluded property that Mawhinney owned, filled with two bags of lime and a blue tarp. Authorities and a sniffer dog discovered the grave in August 2019, but no body was found in the grave, and said items were found to have been removed.

Jennifer's family issued a statement after the arrests: "Although we are relieved that the wait for these charges is over, for us, there is no sense of closure. Nothing can bring Jennifer back. We miss her every day and will forever mourn her loss."

On January 8, Fotis' bond was set at $6 million. He was released the following day and was due to return to court on February 28, 2020.

In a statement issued in May 2020, Troconis said it was a "mistake" to have trusted Fotis, but maintained that she did not know what happened to Jennifer or of her whereabouts. Troconis, out on bail, was next scheduled to appear in court on August 6, 2020, to face the charges. Mawhinney was being held in lieu of $2 million bond, but the bond was reduced to $246,000 and he was released October 19, 2020.

Fotis Dulos suicide 

While out on bail, Dulos failed to appear in court on January 28, 2020, for an emergency bond hearing. He was found in an unresponsive state by police at his home in Farmington, having poisoned himself with carbon monoxide by running a vacuum-cleaner hose from the exhaust pipe of his SUV into the interior of the car while it was parked in his garage. Initially, it was reported by some news outlets that Fotis had been found dead, but responders had performed CPR and restored a faint pulse. They transported him by ambulance to UConn Medical Center in Farmington, and from there he was airlifted to Jacobi Medical Center in The Bronx to undergo hyperbaric oxygen therapy. Fotis' five children, whose ages ranged from 8 to 13 when their mother disappeared eight months earlier, visited him at the medical center before he was taken off life support. This marked the first time they had seen their father since he was accused of murdering their mother.

Fotis was pronounced dead at Jacobi Medical Center on January 30, 2020. He was 52 years old. He had left a suicide note in his car that read, "I refuse to spend even an hour more in jail for something I had NOTHING to do with".

In the police report, it states that Fotis' new girlfriend, Anna Curry, was at his home the morning of his suicide. They had planned to drive to the courthouse in Stamford together, but Fotis said that they should drive separately. On the way to the courthouse, Curry received a call from Pattis asking where his client was. She told him that they were driving separately, but the lawyer informed her that Fotis' GPS tracker showed that he was still at home, at which point Curry realized that he must have done something to harm himself and asked Pattis to call 9-1-1.

Media 
Dateline NBC aired the episode "Disappearance of Jennifer Dulos" on 9 September 2019. A followup episode entitled "The Day Jennifer Disappeared" aired on 2 September 2022.

The documentary Vanished in New Canaan: An ID Mystery, which premiered on Investigation Discovery on June 1, 2020, attempts to piece together the facts of Jennifer Dulos' disappearance. The documentary gives an insight into how Jennifer and her estranged husband met at Brown University and started a family. A group of experts and witnesses dissect the events of the case.

The case was covered in a 2021 Lifetime television film, Gone Mom: The Jennifer Dulos story, with Annabeth Gish as Jennifer Dulos and Warren Christie as Fotis Dulos.

Jennifers' Law 

In May 2021, a domestic violence bill  so-called "Jennifers' Law"  received near unanimous support in the Connecticut State Senate.  The proposed law is named after Jennifer Dulos and another victim of domestic violence in Connecticut, Jennifer Magnano, who was murdered in 2007 by her husband, Scott Magnano, in Terryville, Connecticut.  Scott Magnano committed suicide immediately after murdering his wife, in front of two of their three children. On June 28, 2021, Governor Ned Lamont signed the bill into law.

See also 
 Crime in Connecticut
 List of people who disappeared

References

External links 
New Canaan mom Jennifer Dulos is missing: Here's what we know

2010s missing person cases
2019 in Connecticut
Crimes in Connecticut
May 2019 events in the United States
Missing person cases in Connecticut
New Canaan, Connecticut
History of women in Connecticut